Mahnoor is a Pakistani stage actress and dancer. She also appeared in some films and dramas. She married a businessman, Iftikhar Bhatti in 2019.

Career 
She started her acting career with the PTV's drama, Mausam. Then she acted in Al-Falah theatre for almost a year. She also performed in Tamaseel theatre, Shalimar theatre, Mehfil theatre, Alhamra Arts Council and other theatres of Punjab.

Her notable appearances in films include, Sher  Dil (2012), Halla Gulla (2015), Geo  Sar Utha Kay (2017) and Junoon-e-Ishq (2019) and in television include, Mausam, Mammy, Afsar Bekar-e-Khas and Hum Sub Umeed Se Hain.

Filmography

References 

Pakistani stage actresses
Pakistani film actresses
Actresses in Punjabi cinema
Living people
Pakistani television actresses
Year of birth missing (living people)